The 1981 Air Canada Cup was Canada's third annual national midget 'AAA' hockey championship, which was played April 14 – 19, 1981 at the Halifax Metro Centre in Halifax, Nova Scotia.  The Lions du Lac St-Louis won their first national championship, defeating the Kitchener Greenshirts in the gold medal game.  The Antigonish Novas from Nova Scotia won the bronze medal. Future National Hockey League players competing in this tournament were Lyndon Byers, Bobby Dollas, Normand Lacombe, Gary Leeman, Darryl Reaugh, Mike Tomlak and Brad Shaw.

Teams

Round robin

DC8 Flight

Standings

Scores

M.N.S. 4 - Kitchener 2
Calgary 5 - Prince George 1
Lac St-Louis 3 - Notre Dame 3
Notre Dame 4 - M.N.S. 0
Lac St-Louis 8 - Prince George 2
Kitchener 6 - Calgary 4
Lac St-Louis 7 - M.N.S. 1
Notre Dame 6 - Calgary 4
Kitchener 5 - Prince George 2
Lac St-Louis 8 - Calgary 2
M.N.S. 3 - Prince George 0
Kitchener 4 - Notre Dame 2
Calgary 5 - M.N.S. 4
Notre Dame 7 - Prince George 2
Kitchener 7 - Lac St-Louis 3

DC9 Flight

Standings

Scores

Corner Brook 2 - North River 2
Current River 2 - Gloucester 0
Anigonish 7 - Saint John 3
Current River 5 - Saint John 3
Gloucester 6 - Corner Brook 1
Antigonish 4 - North River 1
Gloucester 4 - Saint John 0
Current River 4 - North River 2
Antigonish 8 - Corner Brook 2
North River 4 - Gloucester 2
Saint John 2 - Corner Brook 0
Antigonish 5 - Current River 1
Saint John 4 - North River 4
Corner Brook 4 - Current River 3
Gloucester 4 - Antigonish 1

Playoffs

Quarter-finals
Antigonish 5 - Gloucester 3
Lac St-Louis 8 - Calgary 2
Current River 7 - North River 6
Kitchener 5 - Notre Dame 2

Semi-finals
Lac St-Louis 3 - Antigonish 2
Kitchener 6 - Current River 0

Bronze-medal game
Antigonish 9 - Current River 3

Gold-medal game
Lac St-Louis 7 - Kitchener 2

Individual awards
Most Valuable Player: Dale Derkatch (Notre Dame)
Top Scorer: Normand Lacombe (Lac St-Louis)
Top Forward: Dale Derkatch (Notre Dame)
Top Defenceman: Calvin Fraser (Antigonish)
Top Goaltender: James Falle (Gloucester)
Most Sportsmanlike Player: Mike Vinsky (M.N.S.)

See also
Telus Cup

References

External links
Telus Cup Website
Hockey Canada-Telus Cup Guide and Record Book

Telus Cup
Air Canada Cup
Ice hockey competitions in Halifax, Nova Scotia
Air Canada Cup
Air Canada Cup